Encelia ravenii is a multi−branched perennial shrub, reaching  in height. The branches are lined with oval to roughly triangular leaves a few centimeters long, that are gray-green and woolly in texture.

The inflorescence is a solitary daisylike flower head  in diameter, on a tall, erect peduncle. The head has a center of many yellow disc florets surrounded by up to 25 white ray florets. The involucre consists of long, prominent phyllaries. It blooms in the Spring.

The fruit is an achene about half a centimeter long, usually lacking a pappus. The fruits have ciliate margins

Distribution
The plant is native to Baja California in México, where it is known only from one small granite hill near the Gulf Coast town of San Felipe.

References

 Clark, Curtis (1998). Phylogeny and Adaptation in the Encelia Alliance. Aliso: A Journal of Systematic and Evolutionary Botany, Vol 17, Issue 2.

External links
Encelia ravenii — U.C. CalPhoto gallery

ravenii
Flora of Baja California
Natural history of the Peninsular Ranges
Drought-tolerant plants